Stefano Ricci (1765 – 1837) was an Italian sculptor, active in a Neoclassical style in Florence.

Ricci trained under Francesco Carradori (1747-1824) at the Academy of Fine Arts. In 1802 he gained a teaching position at the Academy. Among his works are the cenotaph of Dante in the church of Santa Croce, Florence and the Purity in the chapel of Poggio Imperiale. Among his pupils was Lorenzo Nencini.

References

External links

1765 births
1837 deaths
19th-century Italian sculptors
Italian sculptors
Italian male sculptors
Accademia di Belle Arti di Firenze alumni
Academic staff of the Accademia di Belle Arti di Firenze
19th-century Italian male artists